9to5: The Story of a Movement is an 2020 American documentary film directed and produced by Julia Reichert and Steven Bognar. The film revolves around 9to5, an organization established to improve working conditions and ensuring the rights of women and families.

The film had its world premiere at AFI Docs on June 19, 2020. It was released on February 1, 2021, by PBS Distribution.

Synopsis
The film follows the 9to5 movement, an organization established to improve working conditions and ensuring the rights of women and families.

Cast
 Karen Nussbaum
 Ellen Cassedy
 Mary Jung
 Jane Fonda
 Lane Windham
 Verna Barksdale
 Kim Cook
 Debbie Schneider
 Carol Sims
 Anne Hill
 Jackie Harris
 Adair Dammann

Release
The film was initially set to premiere at South by Southwest in March 2020, however, the festival was cancelled due to the COVID-19 pandemic. Instead, the film had its world premiere at AFI Docs on June 19, 2020. The film also screened at DOC NYC on November 11, 2020. In December 2020, PBS Distribution acquired U.S. distribution rights to the film, and set it for a February 1, 2021, broadcast as part of its Independent Lens program.

Critical reception
9to5: The Story of a Movement received positive reviews from film critics.

References

External links
 
 

2020 films
2020 documentary films
American documentary films
PBS original programming
Documentary films about women in the United States
Documentary films about feminism
Documentary films about misogyny
Films directed by Steven Bognar and Julia Reichert
2020s English-language films
2020s American films